Westlock-Sturgeon was a provincial electoral district in Alberta, Canada mandated to return a single member to the Legislative Assembly of Alberta using first-past-the-post balloting from 1986 to 1993.

History

Boundary history

The riding was created for the 1986 election from parts of three ridings: the town of Westlock was transferred from Athabasca, while the part of Sturgeon County around Morinville was transferred from St. Albert, along with a small part of Redwater-Andrew.

The riding was abolished only seven years later at the next redistribution. The northern half of the riding was transferred to Barrhead-Westlock, with Morinville and the area east of it going to Redwater and the remainder to Spruce Grove-Sturgeon-St. Albert.

Representation history
The riding's only MLA was Nicholas Taylor, who had led the Liberal Party through its decade-long drought. His election in 1986, along with three other Liberals in Edmonton and Calgary, was a breakthrough for the party.

He was replaced by Laurence Decore as party leader only two years later, but was re-elected in Westlock-Sturgeon in 1989. For the second term in a row, Taylor was the only Liberal MLA in rural Alberta. When the riding was abolished in 1993, he went on to serve as MLA for Redwater.

Election results

1986 general election

1989 general election

See also
List of Alberta provincial electoral districts

References

Further reading

External links
Elections Alberta
The Legislative Assembly of Alberta

Former provincial electoral districts of Alberta